Pyon Kwang-sun is a North Korean artistic gymnast who competed at the 2004 Summer Olympics. She finished seventeenth in the all-around, and she finished fourth in the uneven bars final.

References

External links

1986 births
Living people
Sportspeople from Pyongyang
North Korean female artistic gymnasts
Gymnasts at the 2004 Summer Olympics
Olympic gymnasts of North Korea
Asian Games medalists in gymnastics
Gymnasts at the 2002 Asian Games
Gymnasts at the 2006 Asian Games

Asian Games silver medalists for North Korea
Asian Games bronze medalists for North Korea
Medalists at the 2002 Asian Games
21st-century North Korean women